The carboxypeptidase A family can be divided into two subfamilies: carboxypeptidase H (regulatory) and carboxypeptidase A (digestive). Members of the H family have longer C-termini than those of family A, and carboxypeptidase M (a member of the H family) is bound to the membrane by a glycosylphosphatidylinositol anchor, unlike the majority of the M14 family, which are soluble.

The zinc ligands have been determined as two histidines and a glutamate, and the catalytic residue has been identified as a C-terminal glutamate, but these do not form the characteristic metalloprotease HEXXH motif. Members of the carboxypeptidase A family are synthesised as inactive molecules with propeptides that must be cleaved to activate the enzyme. Structural studies of carboxypeptidases A and B reveal the propeptide to exist as a globular domain, followed by an extended alpha-helix; this shields the catalytic site, without specifically binding to it, while the substrate-binding site is blocked by making specific contacts.

Other examples of protein families in this entry include:

 Intron maturase
 Putative mitochondrial processing peptidase alpha subunit
 Superoxide dismutase [Mn]
 Asparagine synthetase [glutamine-hydrolysing] 3
 Glucose-6-phosphate isomerase

Human proteins containing this domain 
AEBP1;     AGBL1;     AGBL2;     AGBL3;     AGBL4;     AGBL5;     AGTPBP1;   CPA1;      
CPA2;      CPA3;      CPA4;      CPA5;      CPA6;      CPB1;      CPB2;      CPD;       
CPE;       CPM;       CPN1;      CPO;       CPXM1;     CPXM2;     CPZ;

References

Protein domains
Zinc enzymes